Our Daily Bread is a 1934 American drama film directed by King Vidor and starring Karen Morley, Tom Keene, and John Qualen. The film is a sequel to Vidor's silent classic The Crowd (1928), using the same characters although with different actors. Vidor tried to interest Irving Thalberg of MGM in the project; but Thalberg, who had greenlighted the earlier film, rejected the idea. Vidor then produced the film himself and released it through United Artists. The film is also known as Hell's Crossroads, an American reissue title.

In 2015, the United States Library of Congress selected the film for preservation in the National Film Registry, finding it "culturally, historically, or aesthetically significant". In February 2020, the film was shown at the 70th Berlin International Film Festival, as part of a retrospective dedicated to Vidor's career.

Plot 
A couple, down on their luck during the Great Depression, move to a farm to try to make a go of living off the land. They have no idea what to do at first, but soon find other downtrodden people to help them. Soon they have a collective of people, some from the big city, who work together on a farm. A severe drought is killing the crops. The people then dig a ditch by hand, almost two miles long, to divert water from a creek to irrigate the crops.

Cast

Karen Morley as Mary Sims
Tom Keene as John Sims
Barbara Pepper as Sally
Addison Richards as Louie Fuente
John Qualen as Chris Larsen
Lloyd Ingraham as Uncle Anthony
Sidney Bracey as Rent Collector
Henry Hall as Frank
Nellie V. Nichols as Mrs. Cohen
Frank Minor as Plumber
Bud Rae as Stonemason
Harry Brown as Little Man

Reception
Our Daily Bread was a box-office disappointment. Vidor, who produced the film with his own money, said he "just about broke even."

The New York Times called the film "a social document of amazing vitality and emotional impact."

Soundtrack 
 Sidney Bracey – "Just Because You're You"
 The farmers – "You're in the Army Now" 
 Musicians at the farm – "Camptown Races" (music by Stephen Foster)
 Tom Keene – "Oh! Susanna" with modified lyrics (music and lyrics by Stephen Foster)

References

External links 

 
 
 
 
 

1934 films
1934 romantic drama films
American romantic drama films
1930s English-language films
Films directed by King Vidor
Films with screenplays by Joseph L. Mankiewicz
Films about agriculture
American black-and-white films
Social realism in film
United States National Film Registry films
United Artists films
1930s American films